South Side Story is a structured reality entertainment programme first broadcast on BBC Three on 26 January 2015. The six-part series is about musicians and artists in South London. The series has been described as The Only Way is Essex meets Glee.

Production
The series was commissioned by Zai Bennett and Sean Hancock, and produced by Knickerbockerglory. A non-transmission pilot episode was made in 2013. The director is Ben Cook and executive producer is Jonathan Stadlen.

Main cast

References

External links
 
 

2015 British television series debuts
2015 British television series endings
2010s British reality television series
BBC high definition shows
BBC reality television shows
Television shows set in London
English-language television shows